Brigadeiro Cabral Airport  is the airport serving Divinópolis, Brazil.

It is managed by contract by Infraero.

History
A new passenger terminal was opened on June 1, 2012.

Airlines and destinations
No scheduled flights operate at this airport.

Access

See also

List of airports in Brazil

References

External links

Airports in Minas Gerais